CNTM is an acronym. It may be used for:
Canada's Next Top Model, a Canadian reality show, 
China's Next Top Model, a Chinese reality show,
Consiliul National Al Tineretului Din Moldova, Moldovia's national youth forum